This is a list of the duchies and dukes of Pomerania.

Dukes of the Slavic Pomeranian tribes (All Pomerania) 

The lands of Pomerania were firstly ruled by local tribes, who settled in Pomerania around the 10th and 11th centuries.

Non-dynastic

In 1106, Pomerania is divided by his two older sons: Wartislaw, who founded the House of Pomerania and the Duchy of Pomerania, and Świętopełk I. After Swietopelk's death, his lands were occupied by the Saxon prince Lothar of Supplinburg. In 1155, the lands regained independence under Sobieslaw I, who founded the dynasty of the Samborides, and the Duchy of Pomerelia.

Duchy of Pomerania

The Duchy resulted from the partition of Świętobor, Duke of Pomerania, in which his son Wartislaw inherited the lands that would become in fact known as Pomerania.

Partitions of Pomerania

First partition 1155–1264

In 1155, Pomerania was divided in Pomerania-Szczecin and Pomerania-Demmin. In the struggle to shake off Polish and Danish claims to feudal overlordship, Pomerania approached the Holy Roman Empire. In 1181, while staying in the camp outside the walls of Lübeck, Emperor Frederick I Barbarossa recognised Bogislaw I as duke of S(c)lavia, as it was called in the document. However, three years later in the Battle in the Bay of Greifswald (1184) the Danish Canute VI forced Pomerania to accept him as liege lord. In 1190 the Land of Słupsk-Sławno separated itself from Szczecin. With the defeat of Denmark in the Battle of Bornhöved (1227) Pomerania shook off the Danish liege-lordship, except for the city of Szczecin which remained under Danish suzerainty until 1235.

In 1231 Emperor Frederick II granted the immediate liege lordship over Pomerania to the Margrave of Brandenburg, who enforced this claim by the Treaties of Kremmen (1236) and of Landin (1250). Thus Pomerania had become a fief of Brandenburg, thus an only mediate (indirect) subfief of the Empire, with Brandenburg itself being an immediate imperial fief.

In 1227, Słupsk came to Eastern Pomerania (Pomerelia) within fragmented Poland, Sławno to Western Pomerania. In 1238 both became part of Pomerelia, ruled by the House of Sobiesław, and following the extinction of the line in 1294, both were directly reintegrated with Poland in accordance with the Treaty of Kępno. In 1317, the area became part of the Pomerania-Wolgast (Wołogoszcz), first as a pawn from Brandenburg, and definitively in 1347.

After Wartislaw III died heirless in 1264, Barnim I became sole duke of the whole duchy. After Barnim's death, the duchy was to be ruled by his sons Barnim II, Otto I and Bogislaw IV. The first years, Bogislaw, being the eldest, ruled in place of his too young brothers.

Second partition 1295–1368

In 1295, the Duchy of Pomerania was divided roughly by the Peene and Ina rivers, with the areas north of these rivers ruled by Bogislaw IV became Pomerania-Wolgast, whereas Otto I received Pomerania-Szczecin south of these rivers.

Third partition 1368–1376

In 1368, Pomerania-Wolgast was divided into a western part (German: Wolgast diesseits der Swine, including the name-giving residence in Wolgast) and an eastern part (German: Wolgast jenseits der Swine, in literature also called Pomerania-Stolp or Duchy of Słupsk after the residence in Słupsk (Stolp)), which came back under Polish suzerainty as a fief.

Fourth partition 1376/1377–1478 and Pomeranian immediacy 
In 1376, the western part of Pomerania-Wolgast (German: Wolgast diesseits der Swine) was subdivided in a smaller western part sometimes named Pomerania-Barth (Bardo) after the residence in Barth, and an eastern part which included the residence in Wolgast. In the following year, the Duchy of Słupsk was divided into a western part which included Stargard and an eastern part which included the residence in Słupsk (Stolp).

In 1459, the eastern partitions of Pomerania-Wolgast around Stargard and Stolp ceased to exist. In 1478, after 200 years of partition, the duchy was reunited for a short period when all her parts were inherited by Bogislaw X. By the Treaty of Pyritz in 1493 Pomerania shook off the Marcher liege lordship and became again an immediate imperial estate, after new disputes finally confirmed by the Treaty of Grimnitz in 1529, both treaties provided Brandenburg succession in case the Pomeranian dukes would become extinct in the male line.

Fifth and sixth partitions 1531–1625
In 1531, Pomerania was partitioned into Pomerania-Stettin (Szczecin) and Pomerania-Wolgast. This time however, in contrast to the earlier partitions with the same names, Pomerania-Wolgast included the western, and Pomerania-Stettin the eastern parts of the duchy. In 1569, were created the duchies of -Barth (split off from -Wolgast) and -Rügenwalde (Darłowo) (split off from -Stettin).

Definitive reunification and annexation to Sweden

In 1625, Bogislaw XIV reunited all Pomerania under his rule. However, in 1637, Sweden hold western parts of Pomerania (Hither Pomerania), originally including Stettin, legalised by the Peace of Westphalia in 1648 (Swedish Pomerania, several times reduced in favour of Brandenburgian Pomerania). 
Between 1637 and 1657 Lauenburg-Bütow Land (Lębork and Bytów) were reintegrated directly to Poland as a reverted fief, thereafter passed to Brandenburg under Polish overlordship until the Partitions of Poland. In 1648, Brandenburg prevailed in the Peace of Westphalia with its claim only for eastern parts of Pomerania (Farther Pomerania), with the Brandenburg electors officially holding simultaneously the title of dukes of Pomerania until 1806 (end of the Empire and its enfeoffments), but de facto integrating their Pomerania into Brandenburg-Prussia, making it one of the provinces of Prussia in 1815, then including former Swedish Pomerania.

Dukes of Pomerania: the House of Griffins

Partitions of Pomerania under Griffins rule

Table of rulers
(Note: Here the numbering of the dukes is the same for all duchies, as all were titled Dukes of Pomerania, despite the different parts of land or particular numbering of the rulers. The dukes are numbered by the year of their succession.)

Principality of Rugia 

The Principality was initially a Danish feud, under local rulers, which formed a dynasty.

House of Wizlaw

Duchy of Pomerelia 

In 1155, the lands which belonged to Świętopełk I were organized by Sobieslaw I into the Duchy of Eastern Pomerania, also known as the Pomerelia, a provincial duchy of fragmented Poland. Sobiesław founded the House of Sobiesław.

The dukes of Pomerelia were using the Latin title dux Pomeraniae ("Duke of Pomerania") or dux Pomeranorum ("Duke of the Pomeranians").

Partitions of the Duchy of Pomerelia

In 1215, the duchy was divided in other smaller duchies: Gdańsk, Białogarda, Lubiszewo and Świecie.

In 1271 the duchy is reunited and in 1294 reincorporated directly into Poland per the Treaty of Kępno.

Dukes of Pomerelia

Non-dynastic

House of Sambor (1155–1296)

Later history of Pomerelia
 1296–1299 Part of Kuyavia within Poland
 1299–1308 Part of Poland
 1308–1454 Part of the State of the Teutonic Order
 1454–1466 Thirteen Years' War between Poland and the Teutonic Order
 1466–1772 Pomeranian Voivodeship (1466–1772) within the Kingdom of Poland, which was part of the Polish–Lithuanian Commonwealth from 1569
 1772–1793 Mostly annexed by Prussia in the First Partition of Poland, except for Gdańsk, which remained with Poland until Second Partition of Poland
 1793–1807 Province of West Prussia within the Kingdom of Prussia (Prussian Partition of Poland)
 1807–1814 Part of Prussia, except for the Free City of Danzig (Gdańsk) a Napoleonic client state, with François Joseph Lefebvre ennobled as Duc de Dantzic (1808–1820)
 1814–1918 Part of the Kingdom of Prussia, which was part of the German Empire from 1871
 1814–1829 Province of West Prussia
 1829–1878 Province of Prussia
 1878–1919 Province of West Prussia
 1920–1939 Part of Poland as the Pomeranian Voivodeship, except of Free City of Danzig, a League of Nations mandate
 1939–1945 German occupation: Danzig-West Prussia, province of Nazi Germany
 1945–present Part of Poland again

See also 
 History of Pomerania

Further reading 

 Gerard Labuda (ed.), "Historia Pomorza", vol. 1–4, Poznan-Torun 1969–2003
 Edmund Kopicki, "Tabele dynastyczne", "Wykazy panujacych", in: "Katalog podstawowych monet i banknotow Polski oraz ziem z historycznie z Polska zwiazanych", vol. IX, part I
 Zugmunt Boras, "Ksiazeta Pomorza Zachdniego", Poznań 1969, 1978, 1996
 Casimir Kozlowski, George Podralski, "Poczet Ksiazat Pomorza Zachdniego", KAW, Szczecin 1985
 L. Badkowski, W.Samp. "Poczet ksiazat Pomorza Gdanskiego", Gdańsk 1974
 B. Sliwinski, "Poczet ksiazaat gdanskich", Gdańsk 1997
 Wojciech Myslenicki, "Pomorscy sprzymierzenscy Jagiellonczylow", Wyd. Poznanskie, Poznań 1979
 J. Spors, "Podzially administracyjne Pomorza Gdanskiego i Slawiensko-Slupksiego od XII do poczatkow XIV w", Słupsk 1983
 K. Slaski, "Podzially terytorialne Pomorza w XII–XII w.", Poznań 1960
 Edward Rymar, Krewni i powinowaci ksiazat pomorskich w zrodłach sredniowiecznych (XII–początek XVI w.), Materially Zachodniopomorskie, vol. XXXI

References

External links
 Bogislaw X
 Map of Pomerania and Pomerelia as part of the Hohenstaufen Holy Roman Empire 1138–1254.

 
 
 
Lists of nobility of the Holy Roman Empire
Holy Roman Empire-related lists
Duchies and dukes
Pomeranian duchies